The Charmer is a 1917 American silent drama film directed by Jack Conway and starring Ella Hall, Belle Bennett and Martha Mattox.

Plot summary 
Genuinely sweet natured, Ambrosia Lee loves to help everyone, soothing their sorrows with her cheerful spirit. Her charms are put to the test, when she tries to save her own Aunt Charlotte's marriage. Happily, all ends well, when her Aunt and Uncle are happily reunited.

Cast
 Ella Hall as Ambrosia Lee 
 Belle Bennett as Charlotte Whitney 
 Martha Mattox as Cynthia M. Perkins 
 James McCandlas as Don Whitney 
 George Webb as Franklin Whitney 
 Frank MacQuarrie as Judge Applebee 
 A.E. Witting as Parker 
 Lincoln Stedman as Jed

References

Bibliography
 James Robert Parish & Michael R. Pitts. Film directors: a guide to their American films. Scarecrow Press, 1974.

External links
 

1917 films
1917 drama films
1910s English-language films
American silent feature films
Silent American drama films
Films directed by Jack Conway
American black-and-white films
Universal Pictures films
1910s American films